At the 1990 Goodwill Games, the athletics events were held in Seattle, Washington, United States between July 22 and 26, 1990. A total of 43 events were contested, of which 23 by male and 20 by female athletes. Athletes from the United States and the Soviet Union dominated the competition as they had done in the inaugural edition, with United States coming out on top this time with 54 medal won, 20 of them gold. The Soviet Union was a clear second place with 14 golds and 43 medals in total. The Greater Antillean island nations of Cuba and Jamaica had the third- and fourth-greatest medal hauls, respectively.

The number of competitors in each event was smaller than that of the 1986 Goodwill Games and the invited athletes only had to compete in a single final, rather than the qualification-round model typically found at multi-sport events. Fourteen Games records were beaten in the second edition and one world record was also set at the competition – Nadezhda Ryashkina of the Soviet Union beat the previous best mark in the 10,000 metres track walk with her time of 41:56.23. The 1990 Games saw the athletics competition's first doping infractions, as Tamara Bykova and Larisa Nikitina (both from the Soviet Union) lost their silver medals after testing positive for performance-enhancing drugs.

Ana Fidelia Quirot of Cuba became the first athlete to win two individual gold medals at a single edition of the Games as she won the 400 metres and 800 metres races. The United States took clean sweeps in both the men's and women's 100 metres events, and the Soviet Union completed the same feat in the men's hammer throw and women's marathon competitions. Addis Abebe finished as runner-up in the 5000 and 10,000 metres to win Ethiopia's only medals of the entire Games. Sheila Echols left the Games with one medal of each colour, having won the 4×100 m relay gold, 100 m silver, and long jump bronze. Among the other notable multiple medallists, Carl Lewis won the 100 m silver and the long jump gold.

Records

Medal summary

Men

Women

 † = Tamara Bykova of the Soviet Union initially won the high jump silver medal with a jump of 1.92 m, but was later disqualified for ephedrine usage
 †† = Larisa Nikitina of the Soviet Union initially won the heptathlon silver medal with 6236 points, but was later disqualified after testing positive for banned amphetamines

Medal table

Participation

References

Results
Goodwill Games. GBR Athletics. Retrieved on 2010-06-24.
Athletics results (archived). Goodwill Games. Retrieved on 2010-06-24.

External links
Official website

1990 Goodwill Games
1990
Goodwill Games
International track and field competitions hosted by the United States